NGC 432 is a lenticular galaxy of type S0^- located in the constellation Tucana. It was discovered on October 6, 1834 by John Herschel. It was described by Dreyer as "faint, small, round, gradually brighter middle, 12th magnitude star to east."

References

External links
 

0432
18341006
Tucana (constellation)
Lenticular galaxies
Discoveries by John Herschel
004290